Where Have All the Merrymakers Gone? is the debut studio album by American rock band Harvey Danger. It was initially released by the independent record label the Arena Rock Recording Company on July 29, 1997. The second song on the album, "Flagpole Sitta", received extensive airplay in the United States and resulted in the band's fame. As the song gained national attention, the album was picked up and reissued by Slash Records, a label associated with London Records. On July 29, 2014, 17 years to the day after the album's initial release, Where Have All the Merrymakers Gone? was re-released, for the first time as a vinyl LP, by No Sleep Records. The album has been described by Fuse as "a definitive indie power pop punk record at a time and place where grunge reigned supreme".

The album was recorded over three different sessions with John Goodmanson at John & Stu's Place in Seattle, WA. "Private Helicopter", "Terminal Annex", and "Carjack Fever" were recorded on March 16, 1996 and released on a commercially produced cassette tape, titled simply Harvey Danger, which was sold by the band at their shows and sent to music industry professionals. Three more songs ("Flagpole Sitta", "Wooly Muffler", and "Wrecking Ball") recorded at the June 1996 session, were sent on a one-off cassette tape to Slash/London Records at the request of Greg Glover, an intern who was convinced on the strength of the recordings that he should fund a full album. All of the recordings, except one ("Carjack Fever"), became Where Have All the Merrymakers Gone? The total cost of the recording was about $3,000. "Carjack Fever" was later reworked into "(Theme from) Carjack Fever" for the band's next album, King James Version (2000).

The album title comes from a line in the song "Radio Silence," which itself may have been inspired by a line from the Paul Newman film Harper. "Private Helicopter" was released to radio on October 13, 1998.

Track listing

Personnel
Adapted credits from the album's media notes.

Band
 Sean Nelson – vocals, keyboards
 Jeff J. Lin – guitar, organ, violin, backing vocals
 Aaron Huffman – bass, cover design
 Evan Sult – drums

Additional and production

 Abby Grush – Backing vocals
 John Goodmanson – production, engineering, mixing
 Harvey Danger – production
 Greg Calbi – mastering
 Chuck Robertson – photography

Certifications

Release history

References

External links
Harvey Danger's official site

1997 debut albums
Harvey Danger albums
Arena Rock Recording Company albums
Albums produced by John Goodmanson